APTN may stand for:
 Aboriginal Peoples Television Network, Canadian broadcast and cable television network
 Asia-Pacific Telecentre Network, collaborative initiative of the United Nations
 Associated Press Television News, global video news agency